Athar Ali (born 5 March 1961 in Panjan Kasana, Gujrat) is a Pakistani Norwegian who has represented the Norwegian political party Red.

He served as a deputy representative to the Norwegian Parliament from Oslo during the term 1993–1997. He was the first non-Western immigrant to meet as a parliamentary representative; the first to get elected as a regular representative was Afshan Rafiq.

Ali was a member of Oslo municipality council from 1987 to 1995 and 1999 to 2003. He is founder and head of the Norwegian Immigrants Forum. Ali is a graduate in social work. He works as a clinical social worker.

References

Oslo city council biography 

1961 births
Living people
Deputy members of the Storting
Red Party (Norway) politicians
Politicians from Oslo
Pakistani emigrants to Norway
People from Gujrat District
Politicians from Punjab, Pakistan